Phtheochroa albiceps is a species of moth of the  family Tortricidae. It is found in Guerrero, Mexico.

References

Moths described in 1914
Phtheochroa